Christopher was  launched in Lancaster in 1809. She sailed as a West Indiaman until 1816 when she sailed to India under a licence from the British East India Company. On her return she returned to the West Indies trade. Later she started trading between London and Quebec. She was wrecked at sea on 5 December 1836.

Career
Christopher first appeared in Lloyd's Register (LR) in the volume for 1810.

In 1813 the EIC had lost its monopoly on the trade between India and Britain. British ships were then free to sail to India or the Indian Ocean under a licence from the EIC.

On 3 January 1816 Christopher, Smith, master, sailed for India under a licence from the EIC.

In December 1835 Christopher arrived off Portland having sustained damage.

Fate
Christopher sailed from Quebec on 17 November 1836 bound for London with a cargo of timber. She was wrecked on 5 December 1836 in the Atlantic Ocean with the loss of all but one of her seventeen crew. The survivor, the carpenter, was rescued by George Gordon, Moorman, master. Four men were still alive when George Gordon arrived on the scene, but one man died in the rescue attempt and the seas prevented the rescue of the two other survivors.

On 23 December 1836 Christopher was found as a floating wreck in the Atlantic, after being abandoned.

Christophers entry in the 1836 issue of LR carried the annotation "LOST".

Citations and references
Citations

References
 

1809 ships
Age of Sail merchant ships of England
Maritime incidents in December 1836